See probabilism for the followers of such a theory in theology or philosophy.

This list contains only probabilists in the sense of mathematicians specializing in probability theory.

This list is incomplete; please add to it.

David Aldous (born 1952)
Thomas Bayes (1702–1761) - British mathematician and Presbyterian minister, known for Bayes' theorem
Gerard Ben-Arous (born 1957) - Courant Institute of Mathematical Sciences
Itai Benjamini
Jakob Bernoulli (1654–1705) - Switzerland, known for Bernoulli trials
Joseph Louis François Bertrand (1822–1900)
Abram Samoilovitch Besicovitch (1891–1970)
Patrick Billingsley (1925–2011)
Erwin Bolthausen (born 1945)
Carlo Emilio Bonferroni (1892–1960)
Émile Borel (1871–1956)
Kai Lai Chung (1917–2009)
Erhan Cinlar (born 1941)
Harald Cramér (1893–1985)
Amir Dembo (born 1958)
Persi Diaconis (born 1945)
Joseph Leo Doob (1910–2004)
Lester Dubins (1920–2010)
Eugene Dynkin (1924–2014)
Robert J. Elliott (born 1940)
Paul Erdős (1913–1996)
Alison Etheridge (born 1964)
Steve Evans (born 1960)
William Feller (1906–1970)
Bruno de Finetti (1906–1985) - Italian probabilist and statistician
Geoffrey Grimmett (born 1950)
Alice Guionnet (born 1969)
Ian Hacking (born 1936)
Paul Halmos (1916–2006)
Joseph Halpern (born 1953)
David Heath (c.1943–2011)
Wassily Hoeffding (1914–1991)
Kiyoshi Itô (1915–2008)
Jean Jacod (1944–)
Edwin Thompson Jaynes (1922–1998)
Mark Kac (1914–1984)
Olav Kallenberg (born 1939)
Rudolf E. Kálmán (1930–2016)
Samuel Karlin (1924–2007)
David George Kendall (1918–2007)
Richard Kenyon (born 1964) - Yale University
Harry Kesten (1931–2019)
John Maynard Keynes (1883–1946) - best known for his pioneering work in economics
Aleksandr Khinchin (1894–1959)
Andrey Kolmogorov (1903–1987)
Pierre-Simon Laplace (1749–1827)
Gregory Lawler (born 1955)
Lucien Le Cam (1924–2000)
Jean-François Le Gall (born 1959)
Paul Lévy (1886–1971)
Jarl Waldemar Lindeberg (1876–1932)
Andrey Markov (1856–1922)
Stefan Mazurkiewicz (1888–1945)
Henry McKean (born 1930)
Paul-André Meyer (1934–2003)
Richard von Mises (1883–1953)
Abraham de Moivre (1667–1754)
Octav Onicescu (1892–1983)
K. R. Parthasarathy (born 1936)
Blaise Pascal (1623–1662)
Charles E. M. Pearce (1940–2012)
Judea Pearl (born 1936)
Yuval Peres (born 1963)
Edwin A. Perkins (born 1953)
Siméon Denis Poisson (1781–1840)
Yuri Vasilevich Prokhorov (1929–2013)
Frank P. Ramsey (1903–1930)
Alfréd Rényi (1921–1970)
Oded Schramm (1961–2008)
Romano Scozzafava (born 1935)
Scott Sheffield (born 1973)
Albert Shiryaev (born 1934)
Yakov Sinai (born 1935)
Ray Solomonoff (1926–2009)
Frank Spitzer (1926–1992)
Ruslan L. Stratonovich (1930–1997)
Daniel W. Stroock (born 1940)
Tibor Szele (1918–1955)
Alain-Sol Sznitman (born 1955)
Michel Talagrand (born 1952)
Heinrich Emil Timerding (1873–1945)
Andrei Toom (born 1942)
S. R. Srinivasa Varadhan (born 1940) - 2007 Abel Prize laureate
Bálint Virág (born 1973)
Wendelin Werner (born 1968)
Norbert Wiener (1894–1964)
David Williams
Ofer Zeitouni (born 1960) - Weizmann Institute
Rudolf Carnap (1891–1970) - one of the giants among twentieth-century philosophers (best known for confirmation probability)
Harold Jeffreys (1891–1989) - one of the giants within Bayesian statistics school
Richard Jeffrey (1926–2002) - best known for the philosophy of radical probabilism and Jeffrey conditioning
Karamat Ali Karamat (1936–2022)
Terence Tao (born 1975) 
Richard M. Dudley (1938–2020)
William Timothy Gowers (born 1963)
Bálint Tóth (born 1955)

See also
List of statisticians

Probabilists

Mathematical probabilists